Saint-Vincent (Issime ) is a town and comune in the Aosta Valley region of north-western Italy. Saint-Vincent, elevation , is a popular summer holiday resort with mineral springs.

Geography 
The town is bounded by Ayas, Brusson, Châtillon, Emarèse and Montjovet.

Notes and references 

Cities and towns in Aosta Valley